Barbie: Big City, Big Dreams is a 2021 computer-animated musical adventure buddy film directed by Scott Pleydell-Pearce, produced by Emory Ronald "Ron" Myrick and written by Christopher Keenan and Catherine "Kate" Splaine.

First released in selected cinemas in the United Kingdom and Ireland on August 20, 2021 before making its debut in the United States on Netflix on September 1, it is the 39th entry in the Barbie film series and the third to feature Barbie's family and/or friends based on Barbie Dreamhouse Adventures after Barbie: Princess Adventure and Barbie & Chelsea: The Lost Birthday. The film is accompanied by its eponymous soundtrack which was released on July 1, 2021, on global digital music streaming platforms.

On 1 February 2022, Mattel Television unveiled a CGI-animated serial adaptation and continuation of the film titled Barbie: It Takes Two. The first half of episodes was released in the U.S. on April 8 and other half on October 1.

Official description 
This film plot follows Barbie swapping the sunny shores of Malibu for the bright lights of Broadway to attend an exclusive summer performing arts program and meets... another Barbie! They become fast friends and discover they share more than just a name as they explore New York City and all its good-feeling features. As they compete for a coveted once-in-a-lifetime Spotlight Solo from Times Square, the friends discover that competition isn't all about winning, it's about striving to be your best, bringing the best out of others, overcoming doubts and sharing the spotlight.

Plot 
Barbie Roberts dreams of being a Broadway star, so she enrolls in a summer program at a prestigious performing Handler Arts Academy in New York City. Her family and friends back home in Malibu wish her well as she arrives at the academy. As Barbie struggles with her luggage, she gets helped by a flexible female student who is from Brooklyn. The academy's custodian informs them that they have showed up a day early, and tells them where the dormitory rooms are.

When Barbie and the girl from Brooklyn find a door with the name "Barbie Roberts" on it, they discover that they have the same name and will be roommates. They give themselves nicknames based on their location to avert future confusions with the two, respectively Malibu and Brooklyn. They bond over their love for music and become fast friends as they hang out and explore New York City.

On the subway, "Malibu" Barbie sees a poster of a popstar named Emmie and is a big fan, but "Brooklyn" Barbie says Emmie is an old childhood friend that she hasn't seen in a long time. The two "Barbie"-named girls then made a pact to not let stardom ruin their friendship. Meanwhile, at the Handler Arts Academy, Emmie appears in disguise so she can be treated like a normal student. Dean Morrison announces that the annual Spotlight Solo will be livestreamed from Times Square. Malibu and Brooklyn meet a costume student named Rafael (who wants to be known simply as Rafa) and his dog Gato. He gives them sequinned dresses that are supposed to sparkle, but the remote control he uses to light up the dresses malfunctions.

During her first week at the academy, "Malibu" Barbie struggles in all of her classes. Ken calls her to ask how she's doing, but she has mixed feelings. Later, the "Barbie"-named girls and Rafa discover that Emmie is attending the school in disguise. When they confronted her, Emmie explains that she lost contact with "Brooklyn" Barbie because of her strict manager-father. With this, Emmie and "Brooklyn" Barbie rekindle their friendship. The "Barbie"-named girls and Rafa then sworn to keep Emmie's disguise a secret.

The "Barbie"-named girls go to Central Park and donned on the dresses Rafa gave them. "Brooklyn" Barbie tells "Malibu" Barbie that her mother is a pilot and her father is worried about her. "Malibu" Barbie can relate because her father is also uneasy about her being in NYC. They take photos to send to their fathers, then dance and twirl in front of a fountain, making their dresses sparkle. Later, Emmie's father, Mr. Miller, comes to Handler Arts Academy to observe the students. He wants Emmie to have the Spotlight Solo, even though Emmie just wants to learn. Rafa records the class as Mr. Miller observes. While Malibu is dancing, she accidentally knocks "Brooklyn" Barbie into an orchestra pit. "Brooklyn" Barbie lands on a percussionist's drum and sprains her ankle.

"Malibu" Barbie feels guilty about the accident, but she and her friends keep a positive attitude and share their struggles. According to a witness, Dean Morrison calls "Malibu" Barbie into a meeting and expels her from the academy for sabotaging "Brooklyn" Barbie, who would later be called by the dean to explain her expulsion. The two "Barbie"-named girls confront each other, break up their friendship and lament over it. Rafa and Emmie discover that Mr. Miller is behind the hullabaloo, leading the latter to confront her father, with Rafa forwarding his recorded class video to "Brooklyn" Barbie, who in turn shows it to Dean Morrison.

"Malibu" Barbie goes back home to California devastated about the thought of "Brooklyn" Barbie sabotaging her. With the truth and guilt feeling dawned on her after seeing it all for herself, Barbie decides to give up music. However, "Brooklyn" Barbie and her mother follows her home route to California so that the former can apologize to "Malibu" Barbie and bring her back to the academy. They reconciled and when they return to the academy, they find out they had obtained the Spotlight Solo. On the big night, the MC Emmie reveals her identity during the livestream and introduces the "Barbie"-named girls, who appear in their now-lit-up sequinned outfits Rafa gave them earlier and perform a song about their friendship journey (known as "See You at the Finish Line") while their family and friends watch live in Times Square. After their performance, Barbie "Malibu" and Barbie "Brooklyn" held each other's opposite hand high to signal their unison whiles fireworks go off above the Times Square's skyscrapers.

Voice cast
The voice cast are follows:

 America Young as Barbie "Malibu" Roberts
 Amber May as Barbie "Brooklyn" Roberts
 Kirsten Day as Skipper / Anonymous Student
 Cassandra Morris as Stacie
 Cassidy Naber as Chelsea
 Ritesh Rajan as Ken / Anonymous Student
 Greg Chun as George
 Lisa Fuson as Margaret
 Desirae Whitfield as Nikki
 Cristina Milizia as Teresa / Anonymous Student
 Stephanie Sheh as Renee
 Emma Galvin as Daisy
 Alejandro Saab as Rafa
 Joshua Tomar as Mr. Miller
 Bernardo De Paula as Cab Driver
 Salli Saffioti as Female Custodian
 Giselle Fernandez as Emmie (nicknamed Lee)
 Dinora Walcott as Dean Morrison
 Gabe Kunda as Male opera singer
 Daniel M.K. Cohen as Percussionist

Other characters include the parents of Barbie "Brooklyn" Roberts and Rafael's dog Gato.

Soundtrack 

As already mentioned, the film is accompanied by its eponymous soundtrack which was released on global digital music streaming platforms on July 1, 2021.

Promotion 
An all-round marketing programme supported the launch of the film in the UK and Ireland where it was released in cinemas on August 20, 2021. Before the film's release, the official Barbie shop section of the Mattel website displayed a countdown banner towards the US Netflix release. British pop singer and DJ Fleur East hosted a virtual party to celebrate the film's debut on Pop in the UK & Ireland on October 22.

Release 
Aside the British and Irish theatrical and television release as well as the American Netflix debut, the film was also debuted on global kids' television channels on sperate dates and times including Cartoonito in Italy, 9Go! in Australia, Neox Kids in Spain, Super RTL in Germany and Carousel in Russia and on streaming services via iQIYI in China.

Trivia 

 The Handler School of Performing Arts took its named from Ruth Handler, inventor/creator of Barbie.
 There are artwork cameos of the Barbie Fashionistas and Barbie EXTRA doll lines in New York City.
 The custodian in New York refers to Malibu and Brooklyn as "out-of-towners". This may be a reference to the 1970 film, The Out-of-Towners, which is about two persons that go to New York City.
 There is a Nutcracker cameo when Malibu and Brooklyn perform.
 Barbie "Malibu" Roberts mentions "P.A.C.E" (Positive Attitude Changes Everything), her catchphrase from her series vlogs on YouTube.

Television adaptation

On 1 February 2022, Mattel Television unveiled a CGI-animated television adaptation of the film titled Barbie: It Takes Two. Executives of Barbie: Big City, Big Dreams as well as Mainframe Studios reprise their roles in the series with the inclusion of Marsha Griffin (who previously wrote scripts for 3 Barbie films between 2015 and 2016 in Barbie in Princess Power, Barbie in Rock 'N Royals and Barbie: Spy Squad) as a creative producer.

The series first debuted on television in Australia via 9Go! on March 4 and on Pop in the UK and Ireland on April 2 before launching on Netflix in the United States on April 8. The series also aired on YTV in Canada on April 10 and on Canal Panda in Portugal on April 17.

The American Netflix launch revealed two voice acting replacements; Barbie "Brooklyn" Roberts is voiced by Tatiana Varria instead of Amber May and Rafael/Rafa is voiced by Nicolas Roye instead of Alejandro Saab.

Release titles by language 

 Barbie: Grande Città, Grandi Sogni (Italian)
 Barbie: Grande Ville, Grands Rêves (French)
 Barbie: Gran Ciudad, Grandes Sueños (Spanish)
 Barbie: Nagy Város, Nagy Álmok (Hungarian)
 Barbie: Stórborg, Stórir Draumar (Icelandic)
 바비: 큰 도시, 큰 꿈 / Babi: Keun Dosi, Keun Kkum (Korean)
 バービー：ビッグシティビッグドリーム / Bābī: Biggu Shiti Biggu Dorīmu (Japanese)
 Barbie: Storstad, Stora Drömmar (Swedish)
 बार्बी: बड़ा शहर, बड़े सपने (Hindi)
 Barbie: Velik Grad, Veliki Snovi (Serbian)

References

External links 
  (archived)
 
 
 Production website
 The official UK film promotion website

English-language Netflix original films
Barbie films
2021 animated films
2021 computer-animated films
2020s Canadian films
2020s American films
2020s American animated films
American children's animated adventure films
Animated buddy films
American children's animated musical films
Canadian children's animated films
American computer-animated films
Canadian computer-animated films 
Animated films set in Brooklyn
Films set in Malibu, California
Films shot in Malibu, California
Films set in California